Offbeat: A Red Hot Soundtrip is a compilation album from the Red Hot AIDS Benefit Series produced by Paul Heck. It combines elements of ambient, spoken word, and trip hop to expand the ideas of artistic collage and spiritual transcendence of "the Beats". The album is an offshoot of a larger project called The Beat Experience, which explored the legacy of the Beat movement.

Track listing
 "Intro - Transnational Lullabye" performed by Skylab — 0:20
 "Ryu-Ki" performed by DJ Krush — 6:02
 "Train (Interlude)" performed by Christian McBride — 0:49
 "Looking for the Jackalope" performed by Laika — 4:11
 "Krazy Groove" performed by Christian McBride — 2:01
 "Don Cherry (Interlude)" performed by Skylab — 0:46
 "Black Dada Nihilismus" performed by Amiri Baraka + DJ Spooky — 4:12
 "Surrounded by Flowers/I.K.B. 95 (Interlude)" performed by Skylab — 0:36
 "Cartridgemusic" performed by tomandandy — 3:57
 "Rain Rain/The Phone Call" performed by Skylab — 2:13
 "Murder of Lawyers" performed by Soul Coughing — 5:10
 "I Control (Audio Collage #2)" performed by Meat Beat Manifesto — 5:22
 "Hip No Therapy" performed by Barry Adamson — 7:00
 "Why Do I?/Trepanation #1 (Interlude)" performed by Skylab — 0:27
 "It Goes Back" performed by David Byrne — 3:45
 "Laughing Groove (Interlude)" performed by Christian McBride — 0:51
 "Incidental One (Interlude)" performed by Mark Eitzel and My Bloody Valentine — 0:51
 "Wait" performed by Tortoise — 4:35
 "I.K.B. 95 (Interlude)" performed by Skylab — 0:18
 "Characteristic Beat" performed by Emergency Broadcast Network — 3:48
 "Pinball/Wisions of Rotterdam" performed by Spookey Ruben — 1:44
 "Temporally Displaced" performed by DJ Spooky — 4:08
 "Itsofomo (Interlude)" performed by Ben Neill — 0:25
 "Incidental Peace" performed by My Bloody Valentine — 5:36
 "Trepanation #3 (Interlude)" performed by Skylab — 0:14
 "Republican Party" Moby — 1:29

See also
 Red Hot Organization

References

Red Hot Organization albums
1996 compilation albums
albums produced by Tchad Blake
Indie rock compilation albums
TVT Records compilation albums